Gyaring Lake or Zhaling Lake is a large freshwater lake in the Yellow River catchment in China, it is in the southeast of Qinghai Province, on the border between Yushu Tibetan Autonomous Prefecture and Golog Tibetan Autonomous Prefecture. The name of lake means "Long Gray Lake" in Tibetan language. Gyaring Lake is 526 km², with a drainage area of 8161 km², an elevation of 4292 m, a length of 35 km and a mean width of 15 km (max 21.6 km).

Climate

Notes

External links

Lakes of Qinghai
Yellow River
Lakes of China
Ramsar sites in China